Therese Brophy is a camogie player from County Tipperary, Ireland. She won an All-Star award in 2004 and a Lynchpin award, predecessor of the All Star awards, in 2003. She was nominated again for an All Star in 2005.

Career
She played in eight successive All Ireland finals for Tipperary GAA, winning five All Ireland medals in 1999, 2000, 2001, 2002, 2003 and 2004. She won her first All Ireland senior club medal with Cashel in 2007  and a second against Athenry in 2009.

References

Living people
Tipperary camogie players
Year of birth missing (living people)